District 5 is an electoral district in Malta.  It was established in 1921. Its boundaries have changed many times but it currently consists of the localities of Birżebbuġa, Kirkop, Mqabba, Qrendi, Safi and Żurrieq and the hamlet of Ħal Farruġ.

Representatives

References 

 

Districts of Malta